The 2016 United Women's Soccer season is the 22nd season of pro-am women's soccer in the United States, and the 1st season of the new UWS league.  The regular season began on May 14th and ended on July 23rd.

The league was announced with eight teams in the northeastern United States and eastern Canada in December after the USL W-League had folder a few months previously.  Five teams in a western division were added in January before the Canadian Soccer Association refused entry of two Quebec clubs into UWS, leaving the league at 11 teams for its inaugural season.

Teams, stadiums, and personnel

Stadiums and locations

Personnel and sponsorship

Competition format
Each team will play each conference opponent once at home and once away.
The championship match will be played between the winners of each conference.

East Conference

West Conference

UWS Championship

Championship MVP: Julia Hernandez (Santa Clarita Blue Heat)

Statistical leaders

Top scorers 

Source:

Top assists 

Source:

|}

League awards

Individual Awards
Player of the Year: Krystyna Freda (NJC)
Defensive Player of the Year: Rebecca Ritchie (RSL)
Coach of the Year: Roberto Aguas & J.R. Balzarini (NJC)

All-League Team
F: Krystyna Freda (NJC), Kate Howarth (NEM), Kasandra Massey (SAC)
M: Tatiana Ariza (HOU), Jackie Bruno (NJC),  Chloe Castaneda (SAC)
D: Carol Sanchez (LAN), Natalie Norris (RSL),  Kelly Eagan (LIR), Yadira Toraya (SAC)
G: Rebecca Ritchie (RSL)

References

External links 

 
2016
1